Germaine Tillion (30 May 1907 – 18 April 2008) was a French ethnologist, best known for her work in Algeria in the 1950s on behalf of the French government. A member of the French resistance, she spent time in the Ravensbrück concentration camp.

Biography 
Tillion was born on May 30, 1907 in Allegre (Haute-Loire) in south-central France. She was the daughter of Lucien Tillion, a magistrate, and Émilie Cussac Tillion. Her mother was also noted as an art historian and a French resistance fighter. She had a sister called Francoise and they were raised Catholic.

Youth and studies 
Tillion spent her youth with her family in Clermont-Ferrand. She left for Paris to study social anthropology with Marcel Mauss and Louis Massignon, obtaining degrees from the École pratique des hautes études, the École du Louvre, and the INALCO. Four times between 1934 and 1940 she did fieldwork in Algeria, studying the Berber and Chaoui people in the Aures region of northeastern Algeria, to prepare for her doctorate in anthropology.

French Resistance 

As Tillion returned to Paris from the field in 1940, France had been invaded by Germany. As her first act of resistance, she helped a Jewish family by giving them her family's papers. She became one of the members in the French Resistance in the network of the Musée de l'Homme in Paris. Her missions included helping prisoners to escape and organizing intelligence for the allied forces from 1940 to 1942.

Betrayed by the priest Robert Alesch who had joined her resistance network and gained her confidence, she was arrested on August 13, 1942. She was transported in the Convoi des 31000 in 1943.

Ravensbrück
On 21 October 1943, Tillion was sent to the German concentration camp of Ravensbrück, near Berlin with her mother, Émilie, also a resistante. From her arrival on 21 October 1943 to the fall of the camp in spring 1945, she secretly wrote an operetta comedy to entertain the fellow prisoners. "Le Verfügbar aux Enfers" describes the camp life of the "Verfügbar" (German for "available", the lowest class of prisoners who could be used for any kind of work). At the same time she undertook a precise ethnographic analysis of the concentration camp. Other prisoners included Geneviève de Gaulle-Anthonioz, Jacqueline Fleury and Fleury's mother.

Her mother was killed in the camp in March 1945. Tillion escaped Ravensbrück in the spring of that year in a rescue operation of the Swedish Red Cross that had been negotiated by Folke Bernadotte.

In 1973, she published Ravensbruck: An eyewitness account of a women's concentration camp, detailing both her own personal experiences as an inmate as well as her remarkable contemporary and post-war research into the functioning of the camps, movements of prisoners, administrative operations and covert and overt crimes committed by the SS. She reported the presence of a gas chamber at Ravensbruck when other scholars had written that none existed in the Western camps, and affirmed that executions escalated during the waning days of the war, a chilling tribute to the efficiency and automated nature of the Nazi "killing machines."

She documents the dual but conflicting purposes of the camps; on the one hand, to carry out the Final Solution as quickly as possible, and on the other, to manage a very large and profitable slave labor force in support of the war effort (with profits reportedly going to SS leadership, a business structure created by Himmler himself).

Finally, she gives chilling vignettes of prisoners, prison staff, and the "professionals" who were central to the operation and execution of increasingly bizarre Nazi mandates in an attempt to explore the twisted psychology and outright evil behavior of often average participants who were instrumental in allowing, and then nurturing the death machines.

After the war
After the war, Tillion worked on the history of the Second World War, the war crimes of the Nazis and the Soviet Gulags from 1945-1954. She started an education program for French prisoners. As a professor (directeur d'études) of the École des hautes études en sciences sociales she undertook 20 scientific missions in North Africa and the Middle East.

Algerian war 
Tillion returned to Algeria in 1954 to observe and analyze the situation at the brink of the Algerian War of Independence. She described as the principal cause of the conflict the pauperization ("clochardisation") of the Algerian population. In order to ameliorate the situation, she launched 'Social Centres' in October 1955, intended to make available higher education as well as vocational training to the rural population, allowing them to survive in the cities.

On 4 July 1957, during the battle of Algiers, she secretly met with National Liberation Front leader Yacef Saadi, at the instigation of the latter, to try to end the spiral of executions and indiscriminate attacks. Tillion was among the first to denounce the use of torture by French forces in the war.

Later life
Tillion remained vocal on several political topics:
 against the pauperization of the Algerian population
 against the French use of torture in Algeria
 for the emancipation of women in the Mediterranean

In 2004, along with several other French intellectuals, she launched a statement against torture in Iraq.

To celebrate her 100th birthday, her operetta "Le Verfügbar aux Enfers" premiered in 2007 at the Théâtre du Châtelet in Paris. She was Honorary Professor at France's School of Advanced Studies in the Social Sciences (EHESS) at the time of her death in 2008.

Honours
 Grand-croix de la Légion d'honneur (Only five women ever received this award.)
 Grand-Croix de l'Ordre national du Mérite
 Prix mondial Cino Del Duca (1977)
 Croix de Guerre 1939-1945
 Médaille de la Résistance
 Médaille de la déportation et de l'internement pour faits de Résistance
 Grand Cross of the German Merit (2004)
 On 21 February 2014, French President Francois Hollande announced that she will be interred in the Panthéon. She was interred there in May 2015 in a symbolic burial. The coffin of Germaine Tillion at the Panthéon does not contain her remains but soil from her gravesite, because her family didn't want the body itself moved.
 On 11 May 2015, the Maison des Sciences Humaines (MSH) at the University of Angers, a social science research center, was renamed after her and became Maison de la Recherche Germaine Tillion.

Publications 
 
 
 
 
 
 
 ' 

References

Further reading
Adams, Geoffrey (1998). The Call of Conscience: French Protestant Responses to the Algeria War, 1954-62. Waterloo, Ontario: Wilfrid Laurier University Press.
Aussaresses, General Paul. The Battle of the Casbah: Terrorism and Counter-Terrorism in Algeria, 1955-1957. (New York: Enigma Books, 2010) .
Charrad, Mounira (2001). States and Women's Rights. Berkeley: University of California Press.
Horne, Alistair (1978). A Savage War of Peace. New York: Viking Press.
Kahler, Eric (1957). The Tower and the Abyss: An Inquiry into the Transformation of the Individual. New York: Braziller.
Kraft, Joseph (1958). "In North Africa Peace Alone Will Not Be Enough." New York Times. July 6.
Michalczyk, John (1998).  Resisters, Rescuers, and Refugees''. Kansas City: Sheed and Ward.

External links
 Germaine Tillion's website
 In memory of the anthropologist Germaine Tillion 
 French resistance hero Germaine Tillion dies at 100

1907 births
2008 deaths
Burials at the Panthéon, Paris
People from Haute-Loire
French anthropologists
French women anthropologists
Algerian War
Ravensbrück concentration camp survivors
French centenarians
Grand Croix of the Légion d'honneur
Commanders Crosses of the Order of Merit of the Federal Republic of Germany
Grand Cross of the Ordre national du Mérite
Recipients of the Croix de Guerre 1939–1945 (France)
Recipients of the Resistance Medal
Academic staff of the School for Advanced Studies in the Social Sciences
Female recipients of the Croix de Guerre (France)
People who rescued Jews during the Holocaust
Female resistance members of World War II
Women centenarians
French women in World War II
20th-century anthropologists
20th-century French women